Lancaster Moor Hospital, formerly the Lancaster County Lunatic Asylum and Lancaster County Mental Hospital, was a mental hospital in Lancaster, Lancashire, England, which closed in 2000 (the mental health departments left in 1991, but others remained).

History

The main building, which was designed by Thomas Standen, was opened as the First Lancashire County Asylum in 1816. It was extended at various times until 1850, and is grade II* listed. A further building, which was designed by Arnold W. Kershaw in the gothic style and known as "the Annexe", was completed in 1883 and is grade II listed, as are its walls, railings, and gateways.   The hospital's chapel, which was designed by Edward Graham Paley, was built in 1866 and is grade II listed.

Campbell House, a facility for paying "gentlemen" patients, was completed in 1909 and the Ladies' Villa, a facility for paying "lady" patients, was completed in 1916.

The hospital was a pioneering site for the humane treatment of the mentally ill with the introduction of treatments such as electroconvulsive therapy (ECT). The writer Alan Bennett describes his mother's treatment in the hospital in his memoirs.

Following the introduction of Care in the Community in the early 1980s, the hospital went into a period of decline and closed in 2000; the Annexe and chapel have since been converted into apartments, and houses have been built in the grounds.

The hospital was renamed as Lancashire County Mental Hospital in 1930, and as Lancaster Moor Hospital in 1948.

See also

Grade II* listed buildings in Lancashire
Listed buildings in Lancaster, Lancashire
Prestwich Hospital, the second Lancashire County Asylum
Rainhill Hospital, the third Lancashire County Asylum
Whittingham Hospital, the fourth Lancashire County Asylum
Winwick Hospital, the fifth Lancashire County Asylum
Calderstones Hospital, the sixth Lancashire County Asylum

References

External links

 Index of locations of records of the hospital

Hospital buildings completed in 1816
Hospital buildings completed in 1883
Former psychiatric hospitals in England
Hospitals established in 1816
Hospitals disestablished in 2000
Defunct hospitals in England
Hospitals in Lancashire
Buildings and structures in Lancaster, Lancashire
Grade II* listed buildings in Lancashire
Grade II* listed hospital buildings
Grade II listed buildings in Lancashire
Grade II listed hospital buildings
1816 establishments in England